Kugluktuk (Inuinnaqtun and French: Kugluktuk) is the most western territorial electoral district (riding) for the Legislative Assembly of Nunavut, Canada.

The riding consists of the community of Kugluktuk in the Kitikmeot Region.

Former Member of the Legislative Assembly for Kugluktuk, Joe Allen Evyagotailak, stepped down 20 August 2008, stating  that he wanted to run for the presidency of the Kitikmeot Inuit Association (KIA). There was not a by-election as the next general election was to be held 27 October 2008, leaving the riding unrepresented at the last session. At that time, Peter Taptuna was elected. He was acclaimed at the subsequent general election, and was later elected premier by the legislature. He did not run in the 2017 general election, and the riding again acclaimed its next MLA, Mila Adjukak Kamingoak. After the resignation of Kamingoak, Calvin Pedersen, grandson of former MLA Red Pedersen, was acclaimed as MLA on 24 July 2020.

Election results

1999 election

2004 election

2008 election

2013 election

2017 election

2020 by-election

References

External links
Website of the Legislative Assembly of Nunavut

Electoral districts of Kitikmeot Region
1999 establishments in Nunavut